

List of notable players

Statistics are up to date as of 22 August 2012.

Please help to expand this list.

Note: the source for the Career dates and Total apps/goals for a number of the below players is unclear and the reference used should be added.

 
FC Midtjylland
Midtjylland
Association football player non-biographical articles